Max Romeo (born Maxwell Livingston Smith; 22 November 1944) is a Jamaican reggae and roots reggae recording musician who has achieved chart success in his home country and in the United Kingdom. He had several hits with the vocal group the Emotions. His song "Wet Dream" (1968) included overtly sexual lyrics and launched a new style of reggae.

Biography

Early years
Born in St. D'Acre, St. Ann, Jamaica, Romeo left home at the age of 14 and worked on a sugar plantation outside Clarendon, before winning a local talent competition when he was 18. This prompted a move to the capital, Kingston, in order to embark on a musical career.

Career debuts
In 1965, Romeo joined up with Kenneth Knight and Lloyd Shakespeare in The Emotions, whilst also working in sales for the Caltone label. The group were unsuccessful in auditions for other producers, but Ken Lack offered them an audition after overhearing Smith singing to himself while working. In 1966, the group had their first hit, with the Lack-produced "(Buy You) A Rainbow". The Emotions went on to release several hit singles, and by 1968, the singer, by that point known as Max Romeo began his solo career in 1968, but did not have any great successes on the charts. Romeo returned to The Emotions, now recording for Phil Pratt, and founded a new band, The Hippy Boys.

Solo career

1968 saw the breakthrough in Romeo's career, when he wrote "Wet Dream", a song that became a massive hit in Jamaica. The track was banned by the BBC Radio in the UK due to its overtly sexual lyrics, although the singer claimed that it was about a leaking roof. Nevertheless, "Wet Dream" became a Top 10 hit in the UK, where it spent six months in the chart. Further records that came out in 1969 were "Belly Woman", "Wine Her Goosie" and "Mini-Skirt Vision", as well as Max Romeo's debut LP, A Dream. Romeo was banned from performing at several venues during a tour of the UK.

In 1970, Romeo returned to Jamaica setting up Romax, an unsuccessful record label and sound system, and released in 1971 his second album, Let the Power Fall. It included a number of politically charged songs, most advocating the democratic socialist People's National Party (PNP), which chose his song "Let the Power Fall" as their theme song for the 1972 Jamaican general election. After this, Romeo worked with producer Lee "Scratch" Perry on the album Revelation Time (1975), which featured the classic song "Three Blind Mice", an adaptation of the nursery rhyme with lyrics about a police raid on a party.

In 1976, Romeo released War Ina Babylon, an album perceived as his best work. The politically and religiously themed album included the popular single "Chase the Devil", which would become one of his most known songs. Shortly after this, the pair fell out, leaving Romeo to self-produce his follow-up album, Reconstruction, which, however, could not match the success of its predecessors when it was released in 1977.

In 1978, Romeo moved to New York City, where he co-wrote (with Hair producer Michael Butler) the musical Reggae, which he also starred in.

In 1980, he appeared as a backing vocalist on "Dance" on The Rolling Stones album Emotional Rescue. In 1981, the favour was returned when Keith Richards of The Rolling Stones co-produced and played on Romeo's album Holding Out My Love to You, an unsuccessful attempt to break into the North American market.

The rest of his output during the decade went practically unnoticed, with Romeo finding work at a New York electronics store. John Holt encouraged him to return to Jamaica, and he lived at Holt's house in Meadowbrook for a year.

Romeo visited the UK again in 1992, recording albums Fari – Captain of My Ship (1992) and Our Rights (1995) with Jah Shaka. He joined up with UK rhythm section/production team Mafia & Fluxy in 1998 for the album Selassie I Forever. A compilation album, The Many Moods of Max Romeo, was released in the UK in 1999.

In 2014, he released the album Father and Sons, a collaboration with his sons Ronaldo and Romario (known as the duo Rominal). His daughter Azana Smith has also started a recording career under the name Xana Romeo.

Discography

Albums
1969: A Dream
1971: Let the Power Fall
1975: Revelation Time (re-released as Open the Iron Gate in 1978)
1976: War Ina Babylon (with The Upsetters)
1977: Reconstruction
1980: Rondos
1981: Holding Out My Love to You
1982: I Love My Music
1984: Max Romeo Meets Owen Gray at King Tubby's Studio (with Owen Gray)
1984: Freedom Street
1985: One Horse Race
1989: Transition (with The Upsetters)
1992: Fari – Captain of My Ship (with Jah Shaka)
1993: On the Beach
1994: The Cross or the Gun
1995: Our Rights (with Jah Shaka)
1998: Selassie I Forever
1999: Love Message
1999: Something Is Wrong
2001: In This Time
2004: A Little Time for Jah
2005: Crazy World of Dub
2006: Max Romeo Sings Hits of Bob Marley
2007: Pocomania Songs
2014: Father and Sons
2016: Horror Zone
2019: Words From The Brave
2020: Revelation Time (remastered with bonus tracks)

Compilation albums
1993: Wet Dream
1999: Open the Iron Gate: 1973–77
1999: The Many Moods of Max Romeo
2000: Pray for Me: 1967 to 1973 – The Best of Max Romeo
2002: Perilous Times: 1974–1999
2002: The Coming of Jah – Anthology 1967–76
2003: Ultimate Collection
2004: Wet Dream – The Best of Max Romeo
2008: Best Of
2009: 36 Carat Golden Hits

Singles

1967: "Don't Want to Let You Go" (with The Emotions)
1968: "Wet Dream" (UK number 10 in June 1969)
1969: "Belly Woman"
1969: "Twelfth of Never"
1969: "Wine Her Goosie"
1969: "Mini-Skirt Vision"
1969: "Blowing in the Wind"
1970: "Melting Pot" (with The Hippy Boys)
1970: "What a Cute Man"
1971: "Let the Power Fall"
1971: "Macabee Version"
1971: "Don't You Weep"
1971: "Ginal Ship"
1971: "Black Equality"
1971: "Chie Chie Bud"
1971: "The Coming of Jah"
1972: "Rasta Band Wagon"
1972: "Public Enemy No. 1"
1972: "No Joshua No"
1972: "Press Along Joshua"
1972: "When Jah Speaks"
1972: "We Love Jamaica"
1972: "Is It Really Over?"
1972: "Aily and Ailaloo" (as Niney and Max)
1972: "Are You Sure"
1973: "Every Man Ought to Know"
1973: "Evening News"
1973: "Rent Crisis"
1973: "Three Blind Mice"
1974: "Corner Stone"
1974: "Don't Rock My Boat"
1974: "Socialism Is Love"
1974: "Put a Little Aside"
1974: "Sixpence"
1974: "A Lie Them a Tell"
1974: "Red House"
1974: "The Reverend"

1975: "One Step Forward"
1975: "God Bless Jamaica"
1975: "Youthman, Rootsman"
1975: "Revelation Time"
1975: "Johosaphatt the Lost Valley"
1975: "Heads a Go Roll"
1975: "Natty Dread Take Over"
1975: "Jamaicans: God Bless You"
1975: "Big Jack"
1975: "Mr. Fixit"
1976: "War in a Babylon (It Sipple Out Deh)"
1976: "Fire Fe the Vatican"
1976: "Hola Zion"
1976: "I Chase the Devil"
1976: "Mr. Jones"
1976: "Deacon Wife"
1976: "If Them Ever"
1977: "Norman"
1982: "I Love My Music"
1988: "Keep on Moving"
1992: "Fari – Captain of My Ship"
1992: "Rich People"
1992: "Melt Away"
1993: "Wicked Have to Run Away"
1998: "Selassie I Forever"
1999: "In This Time"
2000: "Marching"
2000: "Perilous Time"
2004: "Outta Babylon"
2005: "Juks We a Juks"
2006: "Babylon Fall" (with Rebel Familia)
2006: "Luw Them"
2006: "Give Praises"
2007: "Birth of Reggae Music"
2009: "My Jamaican Collie"
2011: "Protest to the M1"

See also
List of reggae musicians
List of roots reggae artists
Island Records discography
Pama Records

References

1944 births
Converts to the Rastafari movement
Island Records artists
Jamaican male singers
Jamaican reggae singers
Jamaican socialists
Living people
People from Saint James Parish, Jamaica
Trojan Records artists